Since the founding of Social Democratic Party of Finland in 1899 it has seen a steady number of splits and breakaway factions. Some of the breakaway organisations have thrived as independent parties, some have become defunct, while others have merged with the parent party or other political parties

References

Political schisms
Lists of political parties in Europe
Finland, Social Democratic Party breakaway
 
Finland politics-related lists
Social Democratic Party of Finland